Indonesia participated in the 2002 Asian Games held in the city of Busan, South Korea from 29 September 2002 to 14 October 2002. Indonesia ranked 14th with 4 gold medals in this edition of the Asiad.

Competitors

Medal summary

Medal table

Medalists

Badminton

Men

Women

Mixed

Beach volleyball

Men

Women

Karate

Men

Women

Sailing

Men

Tennis

Men

Women

Mixed

References

Nations at the 2002 Asian Games
2002
Asian Games